Erie is a city in Pennsylvania, United States.

Erie may also refer to:
Erie (tribe), a tribe of Native Americans

Places
Lake Erie, one of the five Great Lakes of North America
Erie Canal, a canal running from the Hudson River to Lake Erie

Canada
Erie (electoral district), a former federal electoral district in Ontario
Fort Erie, a former British fort
Fort Erie, Ontario, a town on the Niagara River in the Niagara Region
Fort Erie Airport

United States
Erie, Alabama, a ghost town
Erie, Colorado, a town in both Boulder County and Weld County
Erie High School (Colorado), part of the Saint Vrain Valley School District
Erie, Illinois, a village in Whiteside County
Erie Township, Whiteside County, Illinois
Erie, Lawrence County, Indiana
Erie, Miami County, Indiana
Erie, Kansas, a city in Neosho County
Erie Township, Michigan, a civil township in Monroe County
Erie Township, Minnesota, in Becker County
Erie, Missouri, an unincorporated community
Erie County, New York
Erie Depot or Erie Railroad Station, in Port Jervis, New York
Erie, North Dakota, an unincorporated community and census-designated place (CDP) in Cass County
Erie County, Ohio
Erie MetroParks, the metropolitan park district in Erie County, Ohio
Erie Township, Ottawa County, Ohio
Erie Triangle, the territory encompassing modern-day Erie, Pennsylvania
Erie, Pennsylvania
Erie County, Pennsylvania
Erie International Airport, a public airport serving northwestern Pennsylvania
Erie Falls, one of 24 named waterfalls in Ricketts Glen State Park in Luzerne County, Pennsylvania
Erie National Wildlife Refuge, a property in Crawford County, Pennsylvania
 Mount Erie, Washington, a mountain in Skagit County, Washington.
Roman Catholic Diocese of Erie, a diocese in Pennsylvania

Organizations
Erie Railroad, a railroad connecting New York City with Lake Erie and extending west to Chicago
Erie Insurance Group, a multi-line insurance company, offering auto, home, commercial and life insurance

Vehicles
Erie L-1, 0-8-8-0 steam locomotives of the Erie Railroad built in 1907 by ALCO
FM Erie-built, the first streamlined, cab-equipped dual service diesel locomotive built by Fairbanks-Morse
Erie (steamship, sank 1841), a steam-powered Great Lakes passenger freighter which caught fire and sank in 1841.
USS Erie (1813), a sloop-of-war in the United States Navy in the early 19th century
USS Erie (PG-50), the lead ship in a class of two Patrol Gunboats, launched in 1936

Sport
Erie Blades, two former professional ice hockey teams in Erie, Pennsylvania
Erie Freeze, a charter member of the American Indoor Football Association, team located in Erie, Pennsylvania
Erie Illusion, a women's football team playing in the National Women's Football Association, based in Erie, Pennsylvania
Erie Invaders, a 2000 expansion team of the defunct Indoor Football League from Erie, Pennsylvania
Erie Otters, a junior ice hockey team in the Ontario Hockey League, playing in Erie, Pennsylvania, USA from 1996 to present
Erie Panthers, a former professional hockey team in the East Coast Hockey League from 1988 to 1996
Erie Sailors, several minor league baseball teams that played in Erie, Pennsylvania between 1906 and 1994
Erie SeaWolves, a minor league baseball team based in Erie, Pennsylvania, playing in the Eastern League

People with the name
Edward Erie Poor (1837–1900), Vice-President and then President of the National Park Bank from 1895 to 1900

See also
Erie Railroad Co. v. Tompkins (1938), a United States Supreme Court case which set forth the Erie doctrine
Erie doctrine
Lake Erie (disambiguation)
 Erie County (disambiguation)
 Erie Township (disambiguation)
Eerie (disambiguation)
Éire, meaning "Ireland" in the Irish language. The "r" and "i" are reversed, so it is not the same spelling.